The 1942 United States elections were held on November 3, 1942, and elected the members of the 78th United States Congress. In Democratic President Franklin D. Roosevelt's unprecedented third mid-term election, the Republican Party picked up seats in both chambers. In the House of Representatives, the Democrats lost forty-five seats, mostly to Republicans. The House elections took place after the 1940 United States Census and the subsequent Congressional re-apportionment. The Democrats also lost eight seats to the Republicans in the U.S. Senate. An Independent also lost his seat to a Republican in the Senate. Despite Republican gains, the Democratic Party retained control of both chambers. The election was a victory for the conservative coalition, which passed the Smith-Connally Act and abolished the National Resources Planning Board over the objections of Roosevelt.

Despite the threat and propaganda of World War II, voter turnout was a mere 33.9%. This is in stark contrast to other warring and Anglosphere nations during the period, with voting turnout being 71.1% in 1935 and 72.8% in 1945 in the UK; 69.9% in 1940 and  75.3% in 1945 for Canada, and 94.82% in 1940 and 95.13% in 1943 in Australia. This turnout was and still is historically low, with no other US biennial election yielding so small a turnout, although the 2014 elections remains a close second.

See also
1942 United States House of Representatives elections
1942 United States Senate elections
1942 United States gubernatorial elections

References

 
1942
United States midterm elections
November 1942 events